Joseph Noble Stockett was prominent Maryland landowner during the late 18th and early 19th century.

Career
Stockett was a staunch Federalist who studied medicine but never practiced. He was a member of the Whig Party.

He inherited the family home known as Obligation in Harwood, Maryland and expanded it to its current size.

On February 4, 1817, the State of Maryland commissioned Stockett and James Sanders, both of Anne Arundel County, to build a new bridge over the Patuxent River.

Personal life
His father was Dr. Thomas Noble Stockett. He was married four times and fathered eight children. He hunted foxes, raised horses, and was a member of the South River Club.

References

18th-century American landowners
American bridge engineers
People from Anne Arundel County, Maryland
1779 births
1854 deaths
19th-century American landowners